Events from the year 1963 in South Korea.

Incumbents
President: Park Chung-hee 
Prime Minister: Choi Tu-son (starting 17 December)

Events

Births

 20 July - Moon Sung-kil.

See also
List of South Korean films of 1963
Years in Japan
Years in North Korea

References

 
South Korea
Years of the 20th century in South Korea
1960s in South Korea
South Korea